The Photo is a 2001 Iranian drama film  Written and directed by Hossein Shahabi(Persian: حسین شهابی)

Starring
 Sina Sayyadi
 Shima Nikpour
 Mahdi Sharifi
 Ali Habibpoor
 Fariba Mortazavi
 Farrokhe Yazdanfar
 Niloofar Kazemi

Crew
 Director Of Photography: hamid angaji
 Sound Recorder: ablollahi
 Editor:hossein shahabi
 music: hossein shahabi
 Costume Designer:hossein shahabi
 make up: foroogholzaman sharifi
 Planner: fariba mortazavi
 Assistsnts Director: siavash shahabi

References

2001 films
Iranian drama films
Films directed by Hossein Shahabi